The 1909 Svenska Mästerskapet Final was played on 17 October 1909 between the eleventh-time finalists Örgryte IS and the third-time finalists Djurgårdens IF. The match decided the winner of 1909 Svenska Mästerskapet, the football cup to determine the Swedish champions. Örgryte IS won their tenth title with a 8–2 victory at Walhalla IP in Gothenburg.

Route to the final

Örgryte IS 

On their way to the final, Örgryte IS beat three kamratföreningar. On 29 August 1909, Örgryte won in the preliminary round against IFK Stockholm with 6–4 at home in Gothenburg. In the quarter-final Örgryte IS beat IFK Göteborg, 3–1, at home on 26 September 1909. On 10 October 1909 Örgryte won the semi-final against IFK Uppsala with 5–1 also at home.

Örgryte made their eleventh appearance in a Svenska Mästerskapet final, having won nine, including two against final opponents Djurgården in 1904 and 1906, lost one, and only missed three.

Djurgårdens IF 

Djurgårdens IF managed to get to the Svenska Mästerskapet final without conceding a single goal. On 12 September 1909, Djurgården won the away-game preliminary round, 5–0, against IFK Eskilstuna. 3–0 ended the quarter-final against AIK at home in Stockholm on 26 September 1909. On 10 October 1909, Djurgården beat IFK Norrköping, 6–0, at home in the semi-final.

Djurgården made their third Svenska Mästerskapet final after having lost in both their previous appearances, the 1904 and 1906 finals to final opponents Örgryte IS.

Match details

References 

Print

1909
1909 in Swedish football
Djurgårdens IF Fotboll matches
Örgryte IS matches
Football in Gothenburg
October 1909 sports events
Sports competitions in Gothenburg
1900s in Gothenburg